Maha Purushudu is a 1981 Telugu-language drama film, produced by V. Roshini under the Adithya Chitra banner and directed by P. Lakshmi Deepak. It stars N. T. Rama Rao, Jayasudha, Sujatha and music composed by Chakravarthy. The film which was stuck in development hell received cold response from the people and ended up as a box office bomb.

Plot
Vijay (N.T. Rama Rao), a big industrialist, is very fond of his sister Lakshmi (Sujatha). He falls in love with a beautiful girl Padma (Jayasudha). Vijay wants to perform his sister's marriage in a rich family. So he goes with the marriage proposal, but Lakshmi loves a taxi driver Murali (Murali Mohan). So Vijay performs their marriage. But Murali's mother Kantham (Suryakantham) is very cruel. She doesn't treat Lakshmi well. What will Vijay do in this situation?

Cast
N. T. Rama Rao as Vijay
Jayasudha as Padma
Sujatha as Lakshmi
Murali Mohan as Murali
Satyanarayana as Manmatha Rao
Prabhakar Reddy as Lakshmipathi
Padmanabham 
P. L. Narayana as Dharma Rao
Eswara Rao 
Jagga Rao 
Suryakantham as Kanthamma
Mamatha as Kanakam
Jayamalini as item number

Soundtrack

Music composed by Chakravarthy. Music released by SEA Records Audio Company.

References

Indian drama films
Films scored by K. Chakravarthy
1980s Telugu-language films
Films directed by Lakshmi Deepak